Ramgarh block is one of the administrative blocks of Palamu district, Jharkhand, India. It is also known as Horanda.

History 
Horanda Alias Ramgarh a Taluka/Block, close to Medininager Palamu, is located 27 km from Medininagar (Daltonganj). Horanda is a part of Daltonganj (Vidhan Sabha constituency).

Ramgarh surrounded on every side by mountains is a small beautiful town. It's well covered by Vodafone, Airtel, Uninor, Reliance, BSNL, Aircel, Idea, Airtel 3G, like cellular networks. ATM also available here for SBI near Horanda Bazar.

Languages 
Languages spoken here include Asuri, an Austroasiatic language spoken by approximately 17 000 in India, largely in the southern part of Palamu; and Bhojpuri, a tongue in the Bihari language group with almost 40 000 000 speakers, written in both the Devanagari and Kaithi scripts.

See also
 Daltonganj Assembly
 Palamu Loksabha constituency
 Jharkhand Legislative Assembly
 Jharkhand
 Palamu

References

Community development blocks in Palamu district